The 3rd Lithuanian Fusilier Reserve Battalion was a fusilier battalion of the Royal Prussian Army formed by Lithuanians.

1813

Formation 
Ludwig Yorck von Wartenburg marched into Königsberg on 8 January 1813 and immediately declared the mobilisation of all remaining able-bodied men. First, he called all the Krümper and recruits, which von Bülow had left to the east of the Vistula. So, Yorck created a large training camp to train the new soldiers. On March 1, seven reserve battalions were formed, which were the:

 1st East Prussian Musketeer Reserve Battalion
 2nd East Prussian Musketeer Reserve Battalion
 3rd East Prussian Musketeer Reserve Battalion
 4th East Prussian Musketeer Reserve Battalion
 1st Lithuanian Fusilier Reserve Battalion
 2nd Lithuanian Fusilier Reserve Battalion
 3rd Lithuanian Fusilier Reserve Battalion
The 3rd Lithuanian Fusilier Reserve Battalion was formed in Königsberg, under the command of Captain von Clausewitz from the 2nd West Prussian Infantry Regiment. He was promoted to Major on March 26. In early June, the Battalion was in the vanguard of von Bülow's Corps.

Assigning to various regiments 
The unit retained its name until July 1. This and other reseve battalions were concentrated into reserve regiments on 1 July 1813. The 3rd Lithuanian Fusilier Reserve Battalion was made the 5th Reserve Infantry Regiment's 4th Battalion.

The Battalion was disbanded on December 12 and its men used to reinforce the regiment's other battalions.

1815 
After Napoleon was defeated, the Prussian Army was reorganized, and so the 5th Reserve Infantry Regiment became the 17th Infantry Regiment on 1 March 1815.

Footnotes

Sources 

Lithuanian units of the Royal Prussian Army
Military units and formations established in 1813
Military units and formations disestablished in 1813